Sethusamudram Shipping Canal Project is a proposed project to create a shipping route in the shallow straits between India and Sri Lanka. This would provide a continuously navigable sea route around the Indian Peninsula. The channel would be dredged in the Sethusamudram sea between Tamil Nadu and Sri Lanka, passing through the limestone shoals of Rama Sethu.

Conceived in 1860 by Alfred Dundas Taylor, it received approval of the Indian government in 2005.

The proposed route through the shoals of Ram Setu is opposed by some groups on religious, environmental and economical grounds. Five alternative routes were considered that avoid damage to the shoals. The most recent plan is to dig the channel roughly in the middle of the straits to provide the shortest course and the course requiring least maintenance. This plan avoids the demolition of Ram Setu.

History
Because of its shallow waters, Sethusamudramthe sea separating Sri Lanka from Indiapresents a hindrance to navigation through the Palk Strait. Though trade across the India-Sri Lanka divide has been active since at least the first millennium BCE, it has been limited to small boats and dinghies. Larger oceangoing vessels coming from the West have had to navigate around Sri Lanka to reach India' eastern coast. Eminent British geographer Major James Rennell surveyed the region in late 18th century; he suggested that a "navigable passage could be maintained by dredging of the Ramisseram [sic]". Little notice was given to his proposal, perhaps because it came from "so young and an unknown officer", and the idea was only revived 60 years later. Efforts were made in 1838 to dredge the canal, but the passage did not remain navigable for any vessels except those with a shallow draft.

The project was conceived in 1860 by Commander A. D. Taylor of the Indian Marines and has been reviewed many times without a decision being made. It has been part of the election manifestos of all political parties during elections. The Government of India appointed the Sethu Samudram Project Committee in 1955headed by Dr. A. Ramasamy Mudaliarwhich was charged with examining the desirability of the project. After evaluating the costs and benefits, this committee found the project feasible and viable. However it strongly recommended an overland passage instead of a channel cutting through Rama's Bridge. A land passage would have several advantages, such as avoiding shifting sandbanks and navigational hazards. Several reviews of the proposals followed until the United Progressive Alliance Government of India headed by Prime Minister Manmohan Singh announced the inauguration of the project on 2 July 2005.

In 2008, Prime Minister Manmohan Singh appointed Rajendra K. Pachauri as the head of a six-member committee to look at an alternative alignment avoiding the sensitive Ramar Sethu stretch. In 2013, the committee released its report calling the project "unviable both from the economic as well as ecological angles". The Indian government rejected the committee's report and decided to go ahead with the project in its current form. In 2014, the Modi government decided that the project would be implemented by deepening the Pamban pass which would save the Rama Setu from destruction.  the project remains unfinished.  In July 2020, parliamentary leader T. R. Baalu presented a letter to Prime Minister Modi urging him to finish the project before 2024.  In the letter, Baalu cited tensions between India and China over influence in Sri Lanka, claiming that China will gain too strong of a diplomatic and economic foothold in Sri Lanka if the Indian government does not continue development in the region. In March 2021 the closure of the project was announced. On 12th January 2023, the Tamilnadu Government unanimously passed a rezolution demanding that the project be revived.

Alignments suggested by earlier committees

Issues

Economic
Some naval hydrographers and experts suggest that the project is unlikely to be financially viable or serve ships in any significant way. The time savings for ships sailing from Kanyakumari or Tuticorin is between 10 and 30 hours. Ships from destinations in the Middle East, Africa, Mauritius and Europe, would save an average of 8 hours using the canal. At the present tariff rates, ships from Africa and Europe will lose  on every voyage because the savings in time for these ships are considerably lower than what is calculated in the DPR. This loss is significant because 65% of the canal's projected users are from Africa and Europe. If tariffs are lowered to a point where ships from Africa and Europe will not lose money from using the canal, the IRR of the project falls to 2.6%. This is a level at which even public infrastructure projects are rejected by the government.

The canal is designed for ships of 30,000 metric tonnes and lighter. Most new ships weighing more than 60,000 tonnes and tankers weighing above 150,000 tonnes cannot use this canal.

Costs of project
Axis Bank Ltd. was appointed "loan arranger" for the project in 2005.Since its inception in 2004, costs have risen to at least , interest rates have risen and old loan terms have lapsed. To secure more money, Sethusamudram Corp. Ltd would have to draw up new reports, sit with parliamentary committees and receive fresh approval. The project cost which originally were  will grow by almost , a shipping ministry source said.

Environmental impact

The project would disturb the ecological balance and destroy corals and kill marine life. The area is an important fishing ground for Tamil Nadu and the Gulf of Mannar Marine National Park is in the vicinity of the proposed project. Opposition to the canal's planned route has come from local fishermen who are demanding alternative channels, which are available. They say the planned route would destroy marine life and corals and would impact the trade in conch shells that is worth almost  a year. Deposits of thorium, important for nuclear fuel requirements, would also be affected. Opponents also say that the dumping of dredged material from the Palk Strait and the Gulf of Mannar in deeper waters would "endanger those areas, which are rich reserves containing 400 endangered species, including whales, sea turtles, dugongs and dolphins".

Tsunami expert Professor Tad Murtywho advised the Government of India on the tsunami warning systemhas said that the planned route may result in increased impact from tsunami waves. He wrote, "During the Indian Ocean tsunami of 26 December 2004, the southern part of Kerala was generally spared from a major tsunami, mainly because the tsunami waves from Sumatra region travelling south of the Sri Lankan island, partially diffracted northward and affected the central part of the Kerala coast. Since the tsunami is a long gravity wave (similar to tides and storm surges) during the diffraction process, the rather wide turn it has to take spared the south Kerala coast. On the other hand, deepening the Sethu Canal might provide a more direct route for the tsunami and this could impact south Kerala."

On 21 April 2010, the Supreme Court of India decided to delay the project until an Environmental impact analysis on the feasibility of a route through Dhanuskodi instead of Rama's Bridge had been carried out.

Religion
Opposition to the project came from some Hindu groups that want to preserve the remains of the Rama’s Bridge from the ancient epic Ramayana.

References

External links
Sethusamudram Corporation Limited
Geo-Strategic Implications of Sethusamudram
Manitham's Interim Report on Sethusamudram Ship Canal Project

Ship canals
Canals in India
Politics of India
Proposed canals
International canals
Water transport in Sri Lanka
Transport in Thoothukudi
Gulf of Mannar
Palk Strait
Macro-engineering
Proposed transport infrastructure in Sri Lanka